The Northern Mariana Islands Senate is the upper house of the Northern Mariana Islands Commonwealth Legislature. The Senate consists of nine senators representing three senatorial districts (Saipan & the Northern Islands, Tinian & Aguijan, and Rota), each a multi-member constituency with three senators.

Maria Frica Pangelinan was the first woman to serve in the Senate.

Vacancies
In the event of a vacancy that occurs less than two years before the end of the Senator's term, the Governor of the Northern Mariana Islands appoints the runner-up of the most recent election. Should that individual decline, the next highest vote getting, unsuccessful candidate become the prospective appointee. Should all the previous candidate's decline, the Governor would then choose an eligible citizen for consideration. In the event a vacancy occurs more than two years before the next scheduled election, a special election is held.

Senators of the 23rd Commonwealth Legislature
In the 2022 general election, a coalition of Democrats and Independents won a majority of seats in the Northern Mariana Islands Senate. When the 23rd Commonwealth Legislature convened on January 9, 2023, it elected Edith DeLeon Guerrero its President, Donald Manglona its Vice President, and Corina Magofna its floor leader.

Past composition of the Senate 

In the November 2007 elections, the three senators up for re-election were all re-elected to another four-year term in the 16th and 17th Senate. The Covenant Party, which lost control of the House, entered into coalition with the Democrats and a lone Independent over the Senate's leadership and voting agenda. The CNMI Senate was controlled in 2016 by a Republican majority under Senate President Francisco Borja.

See also
Northern Mariana Islands House of Representatives
List of Northern Mariana Islands Governors

References

External links
 

Politics of the Northern Mariana Islands
Political organizations based in the Northern Mariana Islands
Territorial upper houses in the United States
Government of the Northern Mariana Islands